The International Jewish Labor Bund was a New York-based international Jewish socialist organization, based on the legacy of the General Jewish Labour Bund founded in the Russian empire in 1897 and the Polish Bund that was active in the interwar years. The IJLB is composed by local Bundist groups around the world. It was an "associated organisation" of the Socialist International, similar in status to the World Labour Zionist Movement or the International League of Religious Socialists. The World Coordinating Council/Committee of the Jewish Labor Bund was dissolved in New York in the mid-2000s., although local Bundist groups or groups inspired by the Jewish Labor Bund still exist in France, the UK, Australia and the State of Israel.

History
The Polish Bund had established a representation in New York in 1941, where it began publishing Unser Tsait. In 1947, a conference was held in Brussels at which the World Coordinating Committee of Bundist and Affiliated Socialist Jewish Organizations was founded (i.e. the IJLB). Emmanuel Novogrodski was the secretary of the IJLB until 1961. Novgrodski had been the secretary of the Polish Bund and participated in setting up its New York representation. Early 1948, the Polish Bund withdrew from the World Coordinating Committee.

The IJLB was admitted with an observer statute on the June 1947 Zürich Conference of the reconstituted Socialist International and as an "associated organization" at the Frankfurt founding Congress of the new Socialist International in 1951.

In 1997 commemorative events were organized to celebrate the 100th anniversary of the Bund in New York City, London, Warsaw, Paris and Brussels, where the chairwoman of the Belgian chapter, herself 100 years old, was present.

Summary of ideology
In 1958, the Jewish Labor Bund released a pamphlet commemorating the organization's 60th birthday. In it, the Bund summed up its ideology in seven points.

 Jews are dispersed throughout the World, and are a distinct nationality, though without a common state. They will remain in this situation in the foreseeable future. They cannot be remade into a one-state nation.
 The State of Israel does not represent the entire Jewish People. It does not solve the Jewish problem. Even now, the population of Israel is less than 15 percent of the world's Jewry. Consequently, Israeli leaders are not in a position to assert Zionist claims of leadership over world Jewry, and their policies of Hebraization of Jewish life and of downgrading all Jewish communities outside of Israel (including those in democratic countries, such as the U.S.A) as places of exile are harmful and fallacious.
 The key to the safety and the future of the Jews in Israel is peace with the Arabs. To achieve it, concessions on both sides are needed. Israel should recognize the moral right of the Arab refugees to repatriation and compensation. The Arab nations should recognize the existence of Israel. The United Nations should do their utmost to put an end to the Israeli-Arab conflict which invites Russian penetration into this turbulent region and is a menace to world peace.
 The overwhelming majority of the Jewish people live outside of Israel; almost half of all Jews live in the United States. Jewish problems must be solved in the countries in which the Jews live.
 Assimilation is an escape for individuals, not a solution for a whole people with a distinctive national culture and identity. Pluralism is the life-blood of real democracy, and this principle applies to national and cultural life within countries as well.
 Jewish national problems arising within the countries where Jews reside can be solved on the basis of freedom and democracy – more securely, by democratic Socialism – which will guarantee Jews the rights of freedom and equality, including the right to a free, autonomous self-determination to maintain their own Jewish identity and national culture. Within the Jewish community the Bund strives for a secularized Jewish culture in the Yiddish language.
 Two criteria of Jewish policies – one for Israel, another for the Diaspora - should not be followed. Wherever Jews live – whether as a national minority throughout the world or as a majority in Israel – Jewish policy, certainly Jewish Socialist policy, should be based on the same principles of freedom, democracy, international justice and brotherhood. Reconciliation of the claims of the Jewish people with the rights of other people is the essence of the Bund approach to Jewish problems, an approach which brings into harmony the Bund's Jewish national program with the spirit of democratic Socialist internationalism.

Leadership
Presidents
Motl Zelmanowicz (died 2010)
General secretaries
Emanuel Nowogrodzki (1947–1961)
Emanuel Scherer (1961–1977)
Benjamin Nadel (1992-2004)

Executives of the World Coordinating Committee
Executive of the World Coordinating Committee in 1957:
David Meier, Abraham Stolar, Emanuel Sherer, Emanuel Novogrodski, Benjamin Tabatchinski, Pinchas Schwartz, Leon Oler, Alexander Erlich, J.S. Hertz, Joseph Gutgold, Hershel Himelfarb, Baruch Shefner

Members of the World Coordinating Committee 1957:

Peretz Guterman, F. Shrager, Leon Stern (all three from France), Meyer Treibeer, Berl Fuchs (both from Brazil), Berl Rosner (England), Tschechanowski (Belgium), Shimon Yezher, Tuvie Meisel (both from Mexico), Kowalsman (Uruguay), Alexander Mints, Dr. M. Peretz (both from Argentina), S. M. Oshry, M. L. Polin, Ch. S. Kasdan (all from USA), Artur Lermer, Manie Reinhartz (both from Canada), Paul Olberg (Sweden), Bunem Wiener, Mendel Kosher, (both from Australia), Bentzl Zalwitz, Pesach Burshin, Israel Artuski (all three from Israel)

Bund Congresses
1947 (May 4-10) Brussels
1948 (October 1-8) New York
1955 (April 8–15) Montreal
1965 (April 19-25) New York
1972 New York
1985 New York

Affiliated groups
Bund groups continue to meet in the United Kingdom (Jewish Socialists' Group), France (Centre Medem – Arbeiter Ring), Denmark, Canada, USA, Australia (Jewish Labour Bund, Inc and S.K.I.F.), Argentina, Uruguay and Israel (Arbeter-ring in Yisroel – Brith Haavoda).

From 1959–1978 the Bund operated a summer youth camp called Camp Hemshekh in the Catskills region of New York State. The surviving youth movement of the Bund, S.K.I.F., also ran summer camps in Canada and in Melbourne, Australia. Today, S.K.I.F. operates in Melbourne, Australia, and in France since 1963 as the Secular Club of Jewish Children (CLEJ).

Press
The IJLB published in New York a monthly journal in Yiddish, Unser Tsait. It also published the Jewish Labor Bund Bulletin and the Bulletin of the Jewish Youth Movement. Its Australian and Israeli chapters have their own magazines, Unser Gedank and Lebns Fragn.

In 1957, for the sixtieth years of existence of the Bund, the IJLB published a commemorative book in Yiddish and English with photographs, Der Bund Un Bilder, 1897-1957.

References

External links
 Jewish Labor Bund Bulletin 1947-1953
Jewish Labor Bund Melbourne

Further reading 
Twenty Years with the Jewish Labor Bund: A Memoir of Interwar Poland, by Bernard Goldstein, edited and translated from the Yiddish by Marvin Zuckerman, Purdue University Press, 2016.
The International Jewish Labor Bund after 1945: Toward a Global History by David Slucki, 2012

Bundism
Jewish anti-Zionist organizations
Socialist International
Organizations established in 1947
Organizations based in New York City
1947 establishments in New York (state)